Unlike the other nine sephirot, it is an attribute of God which does not emanate from God directly. Rather it emanates from God's creation—when that creation reflects and evinces God's glory from within itself. The word can be translated as "kingdom/kingship".

Hermetic and Christian Kabbalah
Malkuth means Kingdom. It is associated with the realm of matter/earth and relates to the physical world, the planets and the Solar System. It is important not to think of this sephirah as "unspiritual". Even though Malkuth is the emanation "furthest" from the Divine Source, it is still on the Tree of Life and therefore has its own unique spiritual qualities. It is often said that Kether (the "highest" sephira) is in Malkuth and Malkuth is in Kether. As the receiving sphere of all the other sephiroth, Malkuth gives tangible form to the other emanations. The Divine energy comes down and finds its expression in this plane, and our purpose as human beings is to bring that energy back around the circuit again and back up the Tree.

Some occultists have also likened Malkuth to a cosmic filter, as it lies above the world of the Qliphoth, or the Tree of Death. The Qliphoth, being the world of chaos, is constructed from the imbalance of the original sephirot in the Tree of Life. For this reason Malkuth is associated with the feet and anus of the human body, the feet connecting the body to Earth, and the anus being the body's "filter" through which waste is excreted, just as Malkuth excretes unbalanced energy into the Qliphoth. Another way to understand this is that when one is sitting, as in a meditative state, it is the anus that makes physical contact with the Earth, whereas when one is standing or walking, it is the feet that come in contact with the Earth.

Malkuth is also associated with the World of Assiah, the material plane, and the "densest" of the Four Worlds of the Kabbalah. Because of this relation to Assiah, it is also related to the suit of Pentacles or Coins of the Tarot. Through Assiah, Malkuth is also related to the four Page cards in the Tarot as well. There is also a connection between Malkuth and the tenth card of each suit in Tarot as Malkuth is the tenth sephiroth. In the modern set of playing cards, Malkuth is related to the Suit of Diamonds' symbolizing material wealth, or the treasures found in the physical world. Malkuths association with the Page cards of the Tarot is reflected in the modern playing card deck as the Jacks of the deck. As Malkuth is directly associated with Assiah, Malkuth also represents the second He (ה) in the Tetragrammaton (יהוה), and is associated with the classical element of Earth. 

The Names of God associated with Malkuth are Adonai Melekh and Adonai ha-Arets. The Archangel of this sphere is Sandalphon. The Ishim (Souls of Fire) is the Angelic order associated with Malkuth, and the planetary/astrological correspondence of Malkuth is the Earth. The Qliphah of Malkuth is represented by the demonic order Nehemoth, ruled by the Archdemon Naamah. Symbols associated with this sphere are a Bride (a young woman on a throne with a veil over her face) and a double cubed altar. Where Binah is known as the Superior Mother, Malkuth is referred to as the Inferior Mother. It is also referred to as the Bride of Microprosopos, where the Macroprosopos is Kether.

From a Christian viewpoint this sphere is important since Jesus preached that people should "seek first the Kingdom of God". In some systems, it is equated with Da'at, knowledge in the sense of Gnosis, the invisible sephirah. In comparison with Eastern systems, Malkuth is a very similar archetypal idea to that of the Muladhara chakra. In Shakta Tantra, which is also associated with the Earth, this is the plane in which karma is expressed.

Although Malkuth is seen as the "lowest" sephiroth on the tree of life, it also contains within it the potential to reach the highest. This is exemplified in the Hermetic maxim 'As above so below', and "Kether is in Malkuth, and Malkuth is in Kether".

In popular culture
David Bowie's 1976 song "Station to Station" references the concept in the line "Here are we, one magical movement from Kether to Malkuth/There are you, you drive like a demon from station to station." 

Swiss metal band Samael have released a song titled "From Malkuth to Kether" on their 1998 Exodus EP.

See also
 Malakut

References

Sephirot
Kabbalistic words and phrases